Falsoterinaea fuscorufa is a species of beetle in the family Cerambycidae. It was described by Masaki Matsushita in 1937, originally under the genus Hirayamaia.

References

Pteropliini
Beetles described in 1937